Maikerlin Faviana Astudillo Sequera (born 10 May 1992) is a Venezuelan footballer who plays as a midfielder for Spanish Primera Federación club SE AEM and the Venezuela women's national team.

International career
Astudillo made her senior debut for Venezuela on 5 April 2018, in a Copa América Femenina match against Ecuador.

References

External links
Maikerlin Astudillo at BDFútbol

 
 

1992 births
Living people
People from Ciudad Guayana
Venezuelan women's footballers
Women's association football midfielders
CDE Racing Féminas players
SE AEM players
Segunda Federación (women) players
Venezuela women's international footballers
Venezuelan expatriate women's footballers
Venezuelan expatriate sportspeople in Spain
Expatriate women's footballers in Spain
Primera Federación (women) players
21st-century Venezuelan people